Zalam is a village and municipality in the Qabala Rayon of Azerbaijan. It has a population of 691. The municipality consists of the villages of Zalam and Mollaşıxalı.

References 

Populated places in Qabala District